Death Row Presents... Tha Dogg Pound 2002 is the first compilation album by American West Coast hip hop group Tha Dogg Pound. It was released on July 31, 2001 by Death Row Records and D3 Entertainment.

It comprises unreleased material recorded by Tha Dogg Pound while they were signed on to Death Row Records, remixed and updated by the then-head producer Cold 187um. Tha Dogg Pound were signed to Daz Dillinger's D.P.G. Recordz and released their own album that year called Dillinger & Young Gotti under DPG alias. The album title is meant to imply it is a sequel or response of sorts to Dr. Dre's 2001. The album cover has pictures of Daz and Kurupt from the Death Row family picture.

The album's lead single, "Just Doggin'", peaked at number 99 on both the Billboard Hot 100 and UK Singles Chart.

Track listing

Charts

References

External links

G-funk albums
2001 compilation albums
Albums produced by DJ Clue?
Albums produced by Soopafly
Albums produced by Fredwreck
Albums produced by Cold 187um
Albums produced by Suge Knight
Albums produced by Daz Dillinger
Tha Dogg Pound compilation albums
Death Row Records compilation albums